Bryan County is the name of two counties in the United States:

 Bryan County, Georgia 
 Bryan County, Oklahoma